Bugtitherium is an extinct genus of anthracothere found in late Oligocene (Chattian) deposits in the Bugti Hills of Baluchistan, Pakistan.

Incisor teeth that Pilgrim (1908) referred to Bugtitherium were recognized as instead belonging to the giant paraceratheriid Paraceratherium.

References

Oligocene mammals of Asia
Anthracotheres
Prehistoric even-toed ungulate genera